Britta Katharina Dassler (born 22 July 1964) is a German politician of the Free Democratic Party (FDP) who served as a member of the Bundestag from the state of Bavaria from 2017 until 2021.

Early life and career 
After her bank apprenticeship and studies in savings bank business administration, Dassler passed the association auditor examination. She subsequently was employed in this field from 1989 to 1994 at the Rheinischer Sparkassen- und Giroverband. Since 1994 she has been working as a freelancer and is the owner of the industrial agency "Arte di vivere" in Herzogenaurach.

Political career
From 2015 to 2019, Dassler served as deputy state chairwoman of the FDP in Bavaria, under the leadership of chairman Albert Duin.

Dassler competed for the 2017 federal elections in the constituency of Erlangen and was elected to the German Bundestag via rank 9 on the state list of the FDP Bavaria. In parliament, she was a member of the Sports Committee and the Committee on Education, Research and Technology Assessment. She served as her parliamentary group’s spokesperson for sports policy.

Personal life
Dassler is married to the grandson of Rudolf Dassler, founder of the sporting goods manufacturer Puma.

References

External links 

  
 Bundestag biography 

 

1964 births
Living people
Members of the Bundestag for Bavaria
Female members of the Bundestag
21st-century German women politicians
Members of the Bundestag 2017–2021
Members of the Bundestag for the Free Democratic Party (Germany)
People from Jülich